Newbury Forest Football Club is a football club based in England.

History
The club were founded in 2003 as a Sunday league side. After adding three adult teams and youth teams down to under-10s, the club moved into the English football league system when they joined the Romford and District League in 2008. After winning the senior division in 2010, they progressed to the Essex and Suffolk Border Football League, where they finished third in the Premier Division in 2012. They then moved to the Essex Olympian Football League Division One and were promoted to the Premier Division after finishing third in 2013. The club applied to join the new Division One South of the Eastern Counties League for the 2018–19 season, and their application was successful.

The club entered the FA Vase for the first time in 2015.

Ground
The club play at Oakside Stadium, groundsharing with Redbridge.

Honours
Essex Saturday Premier Cup
Winners [2] 2012, 2014
Romford & District League Senior Division:
 Winners [1] 2009–10

Records
Highest League Position: 4th in Essex Olympian League Premier Division 2014–15
FA Vase best performance: First round proper 2018–19

References

Association football clubs established in 2003
2003 establishments in England
Football clubs in England
Essex Olympian Football League
Eastern Counties Football League
Sport in the London Borough of Redbridge
Essex and Suffolk Border Football League